Perrault may refer to:

 Perrault (surname), people with the surname
 Perrault (horse), a British-bred Thoroughbred racehorse
 Perrault, Ontario, Canada

See also
 Perreault
 Perrault shorthand, an English adaptation of the Duployan shorthand

French-language surnames